Vachellia nilotica subsp. subalata is a perennial tree native to Africa, India and Pakistan.  Its uses include forage and wood.  A common name for it is kauria babul.

Uses

Wood
The wood is not affected much by termites.

References

nilotica subsp. subalata
Plant subspecies